The following is a list of the 241 communes of the Indre department of France.

The communes cooperate in the following intercommunalities (as of 2020):
Communauté d'agglomération Châteauroux Métropole
Communauté de communes Brenne-Val de Creuse
Communauté de communes Chabris-Pays de Bazelle
Communauté de communes Champagne Boischauts
Communauté de communes du Châtillonnais en Berry
Communauté de communes de La Châtre et Sainte-Sévère
Communauté de communes Cœur de Brenne
Communauté de communes Écueillé-Valençay
Communauté de communes Éguzon-Argenton-Vallée de la Creuse
Communauté de communes de la Marche Berrichonne
Communauté de communes Marche Occitane-Val d'Anglin
Communauté de communes du Pays d'Issoudun (partly)
Communauté de communes de la Région de Levroux
Communauté de communes du Val de Bouzanne
Communauté de communes Val de l'Indre-Brenne

References

Indre